The 20607/20608 MGR Chennai Central - Mysuru Vande Bharat Express is India's 5th Vande Bharat Express train, connecting the states of Tamil Nadu and Karnataka.

Overview 
This train is operated by Indian Railways, connecting MGR Chennai Central, Katpadi Jn, KSR Bengaluru City Jn and Mysuru Jn. It is currently operated with train numbers 20607/20608 on 6 days a week basis.

Rakes 
It is the third 2nd Generation train of Vande Bharat Expresses and was designed and manufactured by the Integral Coach Factory (ICF) under the leadership of Sudhanshu Mani[3] at Perambur, Chennai under the Make in India initiative.

Coach Composition 
The 20607/20608 MGR Chennai Central - Mysuru Vande Bharat Express currently has 14 AC Chair Car and 2 Executive Chair Cars coaches.

The coaches in Aqua color indicate AC Chair Cars and the coaches in Pink color indicate AC Executive Chair Cars.

Service 
The Maximum Permissible Speed (MPS) given is 110 km/hr.

Schedule 
The schedule of this 20607/20608 MGR Chennai Central - Mysuru Vande Bharat Express is given below:-

Incidents 
Nearly a week after the flagging of the 5th Vande Bharat Express train, the express train had met with a cattle incident. This happened during the month of November between Katpadi - Chennai section where the calf died and due to this, it suffered a dent in the front part of the locomotive. No casualties were reported during that incident.

See also 

 Vande Bharat Express
 Tejas Express
 Gatimaan Express
 Chennai Central railway station
 Mysuru Junction railway station

References 

Vande Bharat Express trains
Named passenger trains of India
Higher-speed rail
Express trains in India
 
Transport in Chennai
Rail transport in Chennai
Transport in Mysore

